In Immanuel Kant's philosophy, a category ( in the original or Kategorie in modern German) is a pure concept of the understanding (Verstand). A Kantian category is a characteristic of the appearance of any object in general, before it has been experienced (a priori). Following Aristotle, Kant uses the term categories to describe the "pure concepts of the understanding, which apply to objects of intuition in general a priori…" Kant further wrote about the categories: "They are concepts of an object in general, by means of which its intuition is regarded as determined with regard to one of the logical functions for judgments." The categories are the condition of the possibility of objects in general, that is, objects as such, any and all objects, not specific objects in particular. Kant enumerated twelve distinct but thematically related categories.

Meaning of "category" 

The word comes from the Greek κατηγορία, katēgoria, meaning "that which can be said, predicated, or publicly declared and asserted, about something." A category is an attribute, property, quality, or characteristic that can be predicated of a thing. "…I remark concerning the categories…that their logical employment consists in their use as predicates of objects." Kant called them "ontological predicates." 

A category is that which can be said of everything in general, that is, of anything that is an object. John Stuart Mill wrote: "The Categories, or Predicaments—the former a Greek word, the latter its literal translation in the Latin language—were believed to be an enumeration  of all things capable of being named, an enumeration by the summa genera (highest kind), i.e., the most extensive classes into which things could be distributed, which, therefore, were so many highest Predicates, one or other of which was supposed capable of being affirmed with truth of every nameable thing whatsoever."

Aristotle had claimed that the following ten predicates or categories could be asserted of anything in general: substance, quantity, quality, relation, action, affection (passivity), place, time (date), position, and state. These are supposed to be the qualities or attributes that can be affirmed of each and every thing in experience. Any particular object that exists in thought must have been able to have the Categories attributed to it as possible predicates because the Categories are the properties, qualities, or characteristics of any possible object in general. The Categories of Aristotle and Kant are the general properties that belong to all things without expressing the peculiar nature of any particular thing. Kant appreciated Aristotle's effort, but said that his table was imperfect because " … as he had no guiding principle, he merely picked them up as they occurred to him..."

The Categories do not provide knowledge of individual, particular objects. Any object, however, must have Categories as its characteristics if it is to be an object of experience. It is presupposed or assumed that anything that is a specific object must possess Categories as its properties because Categories are predicates of an object in general. An object in general does not have all of the Categories as predicates at one time.  For example, a general object cannot have the qualitative Categories of reality and negation at the same time. Similarly, an object in general cannot have both unity and plurality as quantitative predicates at once. The Categories of Modality exclude each other. Therefore, a general object cannot simultaneously have the Categories of possibility/impossibility and existence/non–existence as qualities.

Since the Categories are a list of that which can be said of every object, they are related only to human language. In making a verbal statement about an object, a speaker makes a judgment. A general object, that is, every object, has attributes that are contained in Kant's list of Categories. In a judgment, or verbal statement, the Categories are the predicates that can be asserted of every object and all objects.

The table of judgments
Kant believed that the ability of the human understanding (German: Verstand, Greek: dianoia "διάνοια", Latin: ratio) to think about and know an object is the same as the making of a spoken or written judgment about an object. According to him, "Our ability to judge is equivalent to our ability to think."
A judgment is the thought that a thing is known to have a certain quality or attribute. For example, the sentence "The rose is red" is a judgment. Kant created a table of the forms of such judgments as they relate to all objects in general.

This table of judgments was used by Kant as a model for the table of categories. Taken together, these twelvefold tables constitute the formal structure for Kant's architectonic conception of his philosophical system.

The table of categories

Schemata
Categories are entirely different from the appearances of objects. According to Kant, in order to relate to specific phenomena, categories must be "applied" through time. The way that this is done is called a schema.

See also
 Categories (Aristotle)
 Categories (Stoic)
 Category of being
 Foundationalism
 Schopenhauer's criticism of Kant's schemata

Notes

Bibliography
Kant, Immanuel, Critique of Pure Reason, Hackett, 1996,  
Mill, John Stuart, A System of Logic, University Press of the Pacific, 2002, 
Palmquist, Stephen, Kant's System of Perspectives: An architectonic interpretation of the Critical philosophy, University Press of America, 1993. 
Zweig, Arnulf, edited by, Kant: Philosophical Correspondence 1759–99, University of Chicago Press, 1967

Kantianism
Philosophical categories
Concepts